Dhu al-Hijja, also spelled Zu al-Hijja, is the twelfth and final month in the Islamic calendar. It is a very sacred month in the Islamic calendar, one in which the Ḥajj (Pilgrimage) takes place as well as the Festival of the Sacrifice.

"Dhu al-Hijja" literally means "Possessor of the Pilgrimage" or "The Month of the Pilgrimage". During this month Muslim pilgrims from all around the world congregate at Mecca to visit the Kaaba. The Hajj is performed on the eighth, ninth and the tenth of this month. Day of Arafah takes place on the ninth of the month. Eid al-Adha, the "Festival of the Sacrifice", begins on the tenth day and ends on sunset of the 13th.

In the Ottoman Empire times, the name in Ottoman Turkish was Zī-'l-Hìjjé or Zil-hig̃g̃e. In modern Turkish, the name is Zilhicce. In Urdu, the month is commonly referred to as Zilhaj or Zilhij.

Hadiths 
According to Islamic traditions, the first 10 days of Dhu al-Hijja are the most blessed days in which to do good deeds according to Imam Ali: "9-10 Dhu al Hajja are the best days for nikah relations."

Narrated Ibn Abbas: The Prophet (peace and blessings of Allah be upon him) said, "No good deeds done on other days are superior to those done on these (first ten days of Dhu al-Hijja)." Then some companions of the Prophet said, "Not even Jihad?" He replied, "Not even Jihad, except that of a man who does it by putting himself and his property in danger (for Allah's sake) and does not return with any of those things." (Reported by Tirmidhi)

Muhammad used to fast the first nine days of this month, owing to their perceived virtue
.

One of the wives of Muhammad said: "Allah's Messenger used to fast the [first] nine days of Dhul-Hijjah, the day of 'Ashurah, and three days of each month." (Reported by Abu Dawud)

Timing 
The Islamic calendar is a lunar calendar, and months begin when new moon is sighted. Since the Islamic lunar calendar year is 11 to 12 days shorter than the solar year, Dhu al-Hijja migrates throughout the seasons. The estimated start and end dates for Dhu al-Hijja, based on the Umm al-Qura calendar of Saudi Arabia, are:

Special days 
 The first 9 days of Dhu al-Hijja for fasting
 The first 10 nights of Dhu al-Hijja for standing (Qiyaam) in Tahajjud
 The 8th, 9th and 10th of Dhu al-Hijja as the days of Hajj
 The 9th of Dhu al-Hijja as the Day of Arafah
 Takbirut Tashreeq is observed from the 9 Dhu al-Hijja till 13 Dhu al-Hijja
 The 10th of Dhu al-Hijja as the Night of Eid
 Eid al-Adha (Festival of the Sacrifice) begins on the 10th day of Dhu al-Hijja and ends on sunset of the 13th Dhu al-Hijja
 18th Dhu al-Hijja - Eid-al-Ghadeer

Prescribed acts of worship 
The following acts have been prescribed for the first nine days of Dhu al-Hijja:
 A person should give extra charity Sadaqah in these 9 days
 Better your Salaah in these days
 Spend time in the Masjid
 Perform voluntary Nafl prayer at home
 Recitation, Memorization and Reading of the Qur’an
 Dhikr
 Dua
 Fasting the first nine days sawm
 Iʿtikāf

On the days of Qurbani, i.e. 10th, 11th, 12th and 13th of Dhu al-Hijja, the greatest action is the spilling of blood of a sacrificial animal (Qurbani).

Reward for fasting and Tahajjud 
According to the hadith, great rewards have been mentioned for fasting the first nine days of Dhu al-Hijja and standing in worship (Tahajjud) in the first 10 nights of Dhu al-Hijja:

This hadith has been classed  as a daeef(weak) hadith by many scholars,

Narrated by at-Tirmidhi (no. 758); al-Bazzaar (no. 7816) and Ibn Maajah (1728) via Abu Bakr ibn Naafi‘ al-Basri, who said: Mas‘ood ibn Waasil told us, from Nahhaas ibn Qaham, from Qataadah, from Sa‘eed ibn al-Musayyab, from Abu Hurayrah. 

This is a da‘eef isnaad because of an-Nahhaas ibn Qaham and Mas‘ood ibn Waasil. Hence the scholars of hadith unanimously agreed that it is to be classed as da‘eef. 

At-Tirmidhi (may Allah have mercy on him) said: 

This is a ghareeb hadith, which we know only from the hadith of Mas‘ood ibn Waasil, from an-Nahhaas. 

I asked Muhammad – i.e., al-Bukhaari – about this hadith and he did not know it except via this isnaad. 

Some of this was also narrated from Qataadah, from Sa‘eed ibn al-Musayyab, from the Prophet (blessings and peace of Allah be upon him) in a mursal report. Yahya ibn Sa‘eed criticised Nahhaas ibn Qaham with regard to his memory. End quote. 

Al-Baghawi (may Allah have mercy on him) said: 

Its isnaad is da‘eef (end quote) 

Sharh as-Sunnah (2/624) 

Shaykh al-Islam Ibn Taymiyah (may Allah have mercy on him) said:

There is some weakness in it. End quote 

Sharh al-‘Umdah (2/555) 

Al-Haafiz Ibn Hajar (may Allah have mercy on him) said: 

Its isnaad is da‘eef. End quote. 

Fath al-Baari (2/534) 

It was classed as da‘eef by Shaykh al-Albaani (may Allah have mercy on him) in as-Silsilah ad-Da‘eefah (no. 5142). 

The reason for the 10 days being distinguished is due to the combination of worship in this period of prayer, fasting, charity, Takbir and Hajj.

From the first nine days of Dhu al-Hijja, it is particularly recommended to fast the Day of Arafah (9 Dhu al-Hijja) as expiation of the sin of two years:

General events 

 9 Dhu al-Hijja, Day of Arafah.
 10-13 Dhu al-Hijja, Eid al-Adha is observed by Muslims on the hajj and around the world in commemoration of the willingness of Ibrahim (Abraham) to sacrifice his son Isma'il (Ishmael) for Allah.

Sunni 
 18 Dhu al-Hijja, assassination of Uthman, the prominent companion and son-in-law of Muhammad and Khadija. Husband of Ruqayyah and Umm Kulthum.

Shi'ite 
 01 Dhu al-Hijja, Nikah (marriage) of Ali and Fatimah – AH 2 (24 February AD 624).
 07 Dhu al-Hijja, martyrdom of Twelver and Ismāʿīlī Shīʿite Imām, Muhammad al-Bāqir ‐ AH 114.
 08 Dhu al-Hijja, Husayn ibn ʿAlī began his journey to Karbalāʾ from Mecca.
 09 Dhu al-Hijja, martyrdom of Muslim ibn ʿAqīl and Hani ibn Urwah in Kufah. It is also a day of supererogatory fasting – AH 60.
 15 Dhu al-Hijja, birth of Twelver Imām, ʿAlī al-Naqī - AH 214 [Disputed date].
 18 Dhu al-Hijja, Shīʿite Muslims celebrate the event of Ghadir Khumm - AH 10.
 19 Dhu al-Hijja, Fatimah went to Ali's house after their marriage.
 23 Dhu al-Hijja, martyrdom of Meesam Tammar, friend of Ali – AH 60.
 23 Dhu al-Hijja, martyrdom of two sons of Muslim ibn ʿAqīl in Kufa - AH 60.
 24 Dhu al-Hijja, event of al-Mubahalah took place ('Eid al-Mubahilah).
 24 Dhu al-Hijja, some historians mention that the Hadith, Ahl al-Kisa', event was also on the same day prior to Muhammad setting out for Mubahila.
 24 Dhu al-Hijja, supplication day and giving of alms with the ring by Ali. In reply verse, "Verily your Walee is Allah; and His Messenger and those who establish Salaat, and pay Zakaat while they be in Rukooʿ. (Maa-Idah: 55)" was revealed.
 25 Dhu al-Hijja, Sura Al-Insan or Hal Ata, or Dahar, which records the giving of alms to orphans, the destitute and travellers by Fatimah Hasan and Husain was revealed.
 25 Dhu al-Hijja, Ali becomes the Caliph of Islam – AH 35.

Notes

References

External links 
Islamic-Western Calendar Converter (based on the Arithmetical or Tabular Calendar).
Hadith on Dhul-Hijjah

93
Islamic terminology